Craig Alan Laughlin (born September 14, 1957) is a Canadian former professional ice hockey right wing, who currently serves as the color analyst for the Washington Capitals on NBC Sports Washington. He played in the National Hockey League with the Montreal Canadiens, Washington Capitals, Los Angeles Kings, and Toronto Maple Leafs between 1981 and 1989.

Biography
Laughlin was born in Toronto, Ontario. As a youth, he played in the 1970 Quebec International Pee-Wee Hockey Tournament with a minor ice hockey team from Toronto.

Laughlin was drafted in 1977 by the Montreal Canadiens.  He played for several years with the Nova Scotia Voyageurs of the American Hockey League, Montreal's minor league affiliate, before he made it onto the Canadiens' roster for part of the 1981–82 season. In September 1982, Laughlin was traded to the Washington Capitals as part of a six-player blockbuster trade that sent him, Brian Engblom, Doug Jarvis and Rod Langway to Washington in exchange for Rick Green and Ryan Walter.   

Laughlin got an opportunity to establish himself as a full-time player with the Capitals. His contributions helped guide the Capitals to their first playoff appearance in team history. Laughlin also served as a team ambassador during his tenure with the Capitals, often making appearances in the Washington, D.C., area to help grow the team's footprint in the region.

Laughlin was traded to the Los Angeles Kings on February 9, 1988, in exchange for Grant Ledyard.  He played the 1988–89 season, his final season in the NHL, for the Toronto Maple Leafs. Laughlin would play one season for EV Landshut of the German Hockey League before retiring from active play.  In 549 NHL games, Laughlin scored 136 goals and had 205 assists.

Laughlin has been the television color analyst for Capitals games since 1990, where he has paired with Joe Beninati since 1996.  He also participates in many Capitals Alumni activities and is involved in charity work in the Washington, D.C., area.

Laughlin played collegiate hockey at Clarkson University; his uniform #22 is retired by the school.

Laughlin and his wife Linda have two children, Courtney and Kyle. The family resides in Anne Arundel County, Maryland.

Career statistics

Regular season and playoffs

References

External links
 

1957 births
Living people
Canadian ice hockey right wingers
Clarkson Golden Knights men's ice hockey players
EV Landshut players
Los Angeles Kings players
Montreal Canadiens draft picks
Montreal Canadiens players
National Hockey League broadcasters
Nova Scotia Voyageurs players
Ice hockey people from Toronto
Toronto Maple Leafs players
Washington Capitals announcers
Washington Capitals players